Eugene Francis Provenzo Jr. (born 1949) is a professor in the Department of Teaching and Learning at the University of Miami. He became a full professor in 1985.

Career
Provenzo's academic interests include the role of the teacher in American society, and the influence of computers and video games on children.  His work has been reviewed in American and British media, including ABC World News Tonight, The Economist, and The New York Times. He has been involved in the analysis and archiving of works by W. E. B. Du Bois and, with Edmund Abaka, edited W.E.B. Du Bois on Africa, Left Coast Press, 2012.

References

External links
 Eugene F. Provenzo web site.
 

1949 births
Living people
University of Miami faculty
People from Buffalo, New York
University of Rochester alumni
Washington University in St. Louis alumni